Ernst Leonard Lindelöf (7 March 1870 – 4 June 1946) was a Finnish mathematician, who made contributions in real analysis, complex analysis and topology. Lindelöf spaces are named after him. He was the son of mathematician Lorenz Leonard Lindelöf and brother of the philologist .

Biography
Lindelöf studied at the University of Helsinki, where he completed his PhD in 1893, became a docent in 1895 and professor of Mathematics in 1903. He was a member of the Finnish Society of Sciences and Letters.

In addition to working in a number of different mathematical domains including complex analysis, conformal mappings, topology, ordinary differential equations  and the gamma function, Lindelöf promoted the study of the history of Finnish mathematics. He is known for the Picard–Lindelöf theorem on differential equations and the Phragmén–Lindelöf principle, one of several refinements of the maximum modulus principle that he proved in complex function theory. He was the PhD supervisor for Lars Ahlfors at the University of Helsinki.

Selected bibliography
Le calcul des résidus et ses applications à la théorie  des fonctions (Paris, 1905)Mémoire sur la théorie des fonctions entières d'ordre fini ("Acta societatis scientiarum fennicae" 31, 1903)With Lars Edvard Phragmén: "Sur une extension d'un principe classique de l'analyse et sur quelques propriétés des fonctions monogènes dans le voisinage d'un point singulier", in: Acta Mathematica'' 31, 1908.

External links
 
 
 
 

1870 births
1946 deaths
Scientists from Helsinki
20th-century Finnish mathematicians
Topologists
19th-century Finnish mathematicians
Academic staff of the University of Helsinki
Members of the Royal Society of Sciences in Uppsala